The Noblesse is a 2014 South Korean television series starring Seo Ji-hye, Park Jung-ah, Hyun Woo-sung and Jung Sung-woon. It aired on JTBC's Monday–Friday time slot from January 13 to July 4, 2014.

Synopsis
The friendship and love stories of two women with completely different backgrounds.

Cast

Main
 Seo Ji-hye as Yoon Shin-ae
 Park Jung-ah as Lee Mi-na
 Hyun Woo-sung as Han Jung-min
 Jung Sung-woon as Park Young-min

Supporting
 Chang Mi-hee as Hong Sun-joo
 Ryu Tae-joon as Baek Gi-ha
 Na Young-hee as Gi-ha's mother
 Sunwoo Eun-sook as Bang Jung-sim
 Lee Si-eon as Yoon Shin-joong
 Han Ye-won as Jung Seok-kyung
 Choi Ro-woon as Park Joon-hee
 Moon Hee-kyung as Park Kyung-ja
 Yoo Hye-ri as Hwang Myung-soon
 Dokgo Young-jae as Park Kyung-joon
 Yoon Ji-min as Yoo Hwa-young
 Lee Jae-woo as Kim Jin-wook

References

External links
  
 

JTBC television dramas
Korean-language television shows
2014 South Korean television series debuts
2014 South Korean television series endings
South Korean romance television series
Department stores in fiction
Television series by Drama House